The 1988–89 West Midlands (Regional) League season was the 89th in the history of the West Midlands (Regional) League, an English association football competition for semi-professional and amateur teams based in the West Midlands county, Shropshire, Herefordshire, Worcestershire and southern Staffordshire.

Premier Division

The Premier Division featured 16 clubs which competed in the division last season, along with six new clubs.
Clubs promoted from Division One:
Millfields
Rocester
Stourport Swifts
Wolverhampton Casuals

Plus:
Hinckley Town, joined from the Central Midlands League
Paget Rangers, relegated from the Southern Football League

League table

References

External links

1988–89
8